The still room is a distillery room found in most great houses, castles or large establishments throughout Europe dating back at least to medieval times.

Original purposes

Medicines were prepared, cosmetics and many home cleaning products created, and home-brewed beer or wine was often made. Herbs and flowers from the kitchen garden and surrounding countryside were preserved for flavoring food and processed into what today we call essential oils, and infused or distilled, or brewed as required to make rose water, lavender water, tinctures, peppermint-based ointments, soaps, furniture polishes, and a wide variety of medicines. The still room was a working room, part science lab, part infirmary, and part kitchen.

Originally, the still room was a very important part of the household. The lady of the house was in charge of the room, and she taught her daughters and wards some of the skills needed to run their own homes in order to make them more marriageable. As practical skills fell out of fashion for high-born women, the still room became the province of poor dependent relations.

Later uses

In later years, as physicians and apothecaries became more widely spread and the products of the still room became commercially available, the still room increasingly became an adjunct of the kitchen. The use of the still room devolved to making only jams, jellies, and home-brewed beverages, and it became a store room for perishables such as cakes.  The still room was staffed by the housekeeper or cook, then later by the still room maid.

If beverages were not dispensed from food service counters, then the design of commercial kitchens in hotels and restaurants traditionally included a still room where tea, coffee and other beverages were prepared and dispensed. These would be located immediately adjacent to hotel lounges. Central in the still room would be a gas or electric water boiler and separate coffee brewers. Crockery, tea pots and coffee pots would also be stored here. Popular British manufacturers of commercial water boilers included Jacksons and Stotts of Oldham. Another famous British manufacturer of high efficiency beverage water boilers was W.M.Still Ltd whose boilers would be found in still rooms, but their product was named after its proprietor and not after the word still room.

Notes

Rooms